The Lord Our Righteousness Church, sometimes called Strong City, is a religious community near Clayton, Union County, New Mexico. It originated with a group of about eighty adherents who migrated to the area from Sandpoint, Idaho in 2000.  In 2008, the community consisted of approximately fifty people.

History

Its leader Wayne Curtis Bent, born May 18, 1941, is known as Michael Travesser within the church. Bent, once a Seventh-day Adventist pastor, left his denomination with others of like mind in 1987 and has since referred to that church as one of the "daughters of the great harlot" condemned in the book of Revelation. Bent claims that, during an experience in his living room in June 2000, God told him, "You are Messiah." Bent has since stated, "I am the embodiment of God. I am divinity and humanity combined."

The group's website has been taken down several times and reinstated. It contains frequently-updated writings and videos, including a nearly two-hour-long documentary entitled Experiencing the Finished Work.

UK media coverage and documentary
British journalist Alex Hannaford visited Strong City in 2004, investigating claims that the group was contemplating suicide. His feature, including interviews with Wayne and Jeff Bent and various sect members, was published in the UK the same year. Hannaford later wrote a follow-up piece for the Sunday Times magazine in the UK.

Three years later, The End of the World Cult, a documentary, aired on Channel 4 in the UK. It covers Bent's announcement that the Day of Judgment began on October 31, 2007. Bent chose that date after calculating a Biblical prophecy number (490) and adding it to the year 1517, when the Protestant Reformation began, yielding 2007 as a result. The specific date, October 31, comes from the day that Martin Luther posted his 95 Theses.

A shorter version including interviews with cult experts and entitled Inside a Cult was broadcast on ABC in Australia, and the National Geographic Channel in the United States. Jeff Bent stated that the National Geographic documentary was highly inaccurate and inflammatory in nature.

Legal issues

Investigation
A former church member has alleged that Bent told his congregation that "God told him that he was supposed to sleep with seven virgins," including the member's own daughters, then only 14 and 15 years old, although further investigation found this allegation to be untrue. The two minor children, the state's only witnesses to the facts at trial, both testified in the primary trial, in subsequent court proceedings and by affidavit, that Bent never touched them sexually in any way, and asserted that the charges against him were baseless. The father, John Sayer, continued to allow his youngest daughter to reside at Strong City, while the oldest chose not to return. Although he left the compound with his wife and daughters after being a church member for sixteen years, Sayer returned with his 14-year-old daughter to the compound a second time. According to Sayer, she was one of three minors taken into state custody for their own protection in April 2008. A New Mexico state Children, Youth and Families Department (CYFD)  spokeswoman said that three minor teens were taken from the compound in the days after an April 22, 2008, investigation. The state judge hearing the case has issued a gag order, and state officials have provided no further details of the investigation.Accusations Against Sect in New Mexico, May 4, 2008. Associated Press report via the New York Times.  Accessed May 6, 2008.

Two weeks after the children were removed and the gag order was in place, Bent was arrested by the New Mexico State Police. The charges were three counts of criminal sexual contact with a minor and three counts of contributing to the delinquency of a minor. The ages and sex of the children in state custody were made public: a 16-year-old boy (no charges of abuse were filed in  connection with the boy), a 16-year-old girl and a 13-year-old girl. He was held on $500,000 bond with an arraignment scheduled for May 8, 2008. Following his arraignment, the judge reduced the bail to $55,000; as of May 9, he remained incarcerated.

The initial charges refer to Bent having inappropriately touched three minor girls in 2006 and 2007. According to the state Department of Public Safety, one of the girls no longer lives in the community.Church leader arrested on sex charges in northeast N.M. May 6, 2008, Associated Press report in the Washington Post. Accessed May 7, 2008.

Bent also freely admits having sexual intercourse multiple times with his son's wife.  Both he and his son state that "God forced Michael" to commit this act of consummation. Bent asserts that though he lay "naked with virgins" and the virgins asked him for sex, he refused.

A June 17 update from Bent's web site and other news reports state that New Mexico authorities released one of the young women previously taken from the compound from state custody.

Both the prosecution and the defense excused one judge in the case. Union County Judge Gerald E. Baca was appointed the case on July 2, 2008.  The jury trial started November 17, 2008.

Conviction
On December 15, 2008, jurors convicted Wayne Bent of one count of criminal sexual contact of a minor and two counts of contributing to the delinquency of a minor. He was acquitted of a second charge of criminal sexual contact with a minor. Bent was allowed to return to Strong City, the sect's compound near Clayton, pending sentencing.  On December 30, Judge Gerald Baca imposed the maximum sentence of 18 years but suspended eight years. He will have to serve at least 8½ years before becoming eligible for release.

An Albuquerque news station reported that as of September 11, 2009, Bent has been on hunger strike while in prison, and a judge has ordered that force-feeding be used should it become necessary. According to the church's website, Bent entered a religious fast that takes the form of a Jubilee fast. It is also claimed that his fast is a protest against his imprisonment 'because of a lie'.

Conviction overturned and reinstated
On June 28, 2011, the New Mexico Court of Appeals overturned all convictions against Wayne Bent. The court determined the grand jury was not legally assembled. In the unanimous three judge decision, Judge Roderick T. Kennedy shares the opinion of the court;

On October 22, 2012, the New Mexico Supreme Court overturned the New Mexico Court of Appeals ruling and Wayne Bent would continue to serve out the remainder of his sentence in prison for the next four years.

Release from prison
Wayne Bent was paroled from prison in February 2016 after being diagnosed with a cancer that threatened the hearing in his left ear. He has since published a book about his legal case on his website. The title of the publication, The Little Book, is taken from a reference found in the biblical book of Revelation, chapter ten.

See also

 Disconfirmed expectancy
 Doomsday cult
 List of people who have claimed to be Jesus
 Millenarianism

References

External links
Official website

Christian eschatology
Christian new religious movements
Organizations based in New Mexico
Christian organizations established in 2000
2000 establishments in New Mexico
Cults